A list of films produced in Finland ordered by year of release. For an alphabetical list of Finnish films see :Category:Finnish films

External links
 Finnish film at the Internet Movie Database

1990s
Films
Finland